Impath Inc., a New York based corporation, was a provider of cancer related laboratory services. Impath filed for bankruptcy protection in September 2003.

Beginning in the late 1990s and until 2003, its business withered away, but its executives continued to talk up their stock and the profitability of their impending anti-cancer breakthroughs.

In May 2004, Genzyme acquired several of Impath's laboratories and cancer-testing technologies.

In September 2005 the United States Securities and Exchange Commission took action against former CEO Anuradha Saad and her colleagues, alleging fraudulent accounting.
The same month Saad pleaded guilty to two counts of soliciting proxies containing false statements.
It was also alleged that Saad improperly charged $120,000 in personal expenses to Impath.
On Tuesday, May 30, 2006, the former president and chief operating officer of Impath, Richard P. Adelson, received a sentence from district court judge Jed S. Rakoff.

References

Companies based in New York City